Nuffield may refer to:

William Morris, 1st Viscount Nuffield, founder of Oxford-based Morris Motors and philanthropist
Nuffield, Oxfordshire, a village in Oxfordshire, England and home of William Richard Morris from which he chose his title, Viscount Nuffield
Nuffield Organization, William Morris's group of motor vehicle manufacturing businesses in the United Kingdom
Nuffield Universal, a make of tractor produced by the Nuffield organisation from 1948
Nuffield Press, a printing and publishing company formerly part of the Nuffield organisation

Institutions (some of the many) founded and endowed by Lord Nuffield from the profits of his businesses:
Nuffield Foundation, a British charitable trust, established in 1943 by William Morris (Lord Nuffield)
Nuffield College, Oxford, one of the constituent colleges of the University of Oxford in the United Kingdom
Nuffield Trust, a charitable trust based in London, whose aim is to produce analysis and debate on UK healthcare policy
Nuffield Health, a charity operating Nuffield Health Gyms, Hospitals, Medical Centres and Nurseries in the UK
Nuffield Science Project, a project of the Nuffield Foundation to improve science education
Nuffield Council on Bioethics, examines and reports on ethical issues raised by new advances in biological and medical research
Nuffield Speech and Language Unit, a centre providing intensive therapy to children who suffer from severe speech and language disorders
Nuffield Orthopaedic Centre, a hospital in Oxford
Nuffield Centre for International Health and Development, resource for education, research and technical assistance in health and development
Nuffield Radio Astronomy Laboratory, since 1999 Jodrell Bank Observatory
Nuffield Respirator, "iron lung" designed by Robert Both manufactured by Nuffield and offered free of any charge to any hospital in the British Commonwealth that might request one